Fjærvoll is a surname. Notable people with the surname include:

Dag Jostein Fjærvoll (born 1947), Norwegian politician, son of Edmund
Edmund Fjærvoll (1910–1975), Norwegian politician 
Ottar Fjærvoll (1914–1995), Norwegian politician

Norwegian-language surnames